Baengnyeonsan is a mountain in Seoul, South Korea, lying on the border between Eunpyeong-gu and Seodaemun-gu. The name "Baengnyeonsan" means "White Lotus Mountain."

References

Mountains of Seoul